Terekty, (Terektı), formerly Oktyabr, is a village in Karasay District of Almaty Region, in south-eastern Kazakhstan.

References

Populated places in Almaty Region